Indigo Jazz and Blues Festival is an international jazz and blues festival held in Bangalore, India. Held in December, the festival attracts musicians from all over the world. It is organized by Radio Indigo.

References

Jazz festivals in India
Culture of Bangalore
Events in Bangalore
Festivals in Karnataka